Halifax was, from 1894 to 1937, a rural district in the administrative county of Yorkshire, West Riding, England.

The district was created by the Local Government Act 1894 as successor to the Halifax Rural Sanitary District, and was abolished by a county review order under the Local Government Act 1929 in 1937.

Area
The district initially consisted of seven civil parishes surrounding, but not including, the town of Halifax. The district was in four portions, divided from each other by various urban districts and municipal boroughs. In 1899 the parish of Skircoat was absorbed by the County Borough of Halifax, and the rural district consisted of the following parishes until abolition:

References

Districts of England created by the Local Government Act 1894
Rural districts of the West Riding of Yorkshire
Local government in Calderdale